Ghar Jamai may refer to:

 Gharjamai, refers to a live-in son-in-law
 Ghar Jamai (1992 film), a 1992 Hindi-language Indian film
 Gharjamai (2008 film), a 2008 Bengali film
 Ghar Jamai (TV series), an Indian comedy television series
 Ghar Jamai (Pakistani TV series), a sitcom; see List of programs broadcast by ARY Digital